Marjorie Minna Jenkins Pratt, Countess of Brecknock  (died 24 August 1989), was a British aristocrat. She was the daughter of Colonel Atherton Edward Jenkins and his wife, Anna Isabella (née Schoenbrunn), the niece of Sir Ernest Cassel. She was a cousin (and life-long close friend) of Edwina Ashley, who married Lord Louis Mountbatten, 1st Earl Mountbatten of Burma.

Family
She married John Pratt, Earl of Brecknock, eldest son of John Pratt, 4th Marquess Camden, and his wife, the former Lady Joan Marion Nevill, on 19 October 1920 in St. Margaret's Church, Westminster, London. They had at least two children:
 Lady Mary Clementine Pratt (5 August 1921 – 9 December 2002)
 David George Edward Henry Pratt, 6th Marquess Camden (born 13 August 1930)

The Earl and Countess of Brecknock divorced in 1941.

Career
She was Lady-in-Waiting to Princess Marina, Duchess of Kent, and Superintendent-in-Charge, St. John's Ambulance Brigade. She was appointed a Dame Commander of the Order of the British Empire in 1967 as well as a Companion of the Most Venerable Order of the Hospital of St. John of Jerusalem (C.St.J.)

See also
Earl Camden

References
 Charles Mosley, editor, Burke's Peerage, Baronetage & Knightage, 107th edition, 3 volumes (Wilmington, Delaware: Burke's Peerage (Genealogical Books) Ltd., 2003), volume 1, p. 653.
 Peter W. Hammond, editor, The Complete Peerage or a History of the House of Lords and All its Members From the Earliest Times, Volume XIV: Addenda & Corrigenda (Stroud, Gloucestershire: Sutton Publishing, 1998), p. 137.

1989 deaths
Brecknock
Dames Commander of the Order of the British Empire
People from London
Place of birth missing
Place of death missing
1900 births
English justices of the peace